Minnewawa is an unincorporated community in Shamrock Township, Aitkin County, Minnesota, United States, along Lake Minnewawa. The community is located along 200th Avenue near Aitkin County Road 6, Goshawk Street. Nearby places include McGregor, Palisade, Tamarack, and Libby.

References

Unincorporated communities in Aitkin County, Minnesota
Unincorporated communities in Minnesota